"Lost in Your Love" is a 1992 song by Tony Hadley. It was his first solo single since the disbanding of Spandau Ballet and spent 4 weeks in the UK charts reaching No.42

References

1992 singles
1992 songs